

Men's 400 m Individual Medley - Final

Men's 400 m Individual Medley - Heats

Men's 400 m Individual Medley - Heat 01

Men's 400 m Individual Medley - Heat 02

Swimming at the 2006 Commonwealth Games